On 30 January 1649, Captain William Hewlett was the officer in charge of the soldiers at the execution of Charles I.

After the Restoration, Captain Hewlett was convicted on 15 October 1660 for his part in the regicide of Charles I on 30 January 1649, but was not executed along with the other men who were tried with him: Daniel Axtell and Francis Hacker.

References

Further reading 
 Excerpts from "The Tryal of William Howlet" (William Hewlet alias Howlet) also spelt Hulet

Regicides of Charles I
English army officers